The Vietnam National Textile and Garment Group (Vinatex) (Tập đoàn dệt may Việt Nam) is a large Vietnamese textile company, and one of Vietnam's largest companies overall.  The company's 'productive sector' consists of over 50 joint stock companies, and 40 joint venture companies, principally involved in manufacture; other listed company sectors include fashion magazines, fashion design institutes and textile-industry vocational schools, universities, real estate, supper market.  Vinatex operates several import-export companies.  Company central offices are located in Ha Noi.

In the first half of 2011 Vinatex' exports reached 1.22bn US$, 20% of the country's total textile exports of 6.16bn.

Regional Organization of Production
Vinatex is currently in a process of decentralizing its production away from major industrial cities to take advantage of lower wages and cheaper land in the provinces.
The vast majority of Vietnam's textiles industry is still located in Ho Chi Minh City, Hanoi and neighbouring provinces.
Vinatex started supporting subsidiaries to move out of Hanoi into neighbouring provinces such as Hưng Yên in 2004.
It announced a strategy to move production closer to the home provinces of its workforces in July 2011 to respond to high costs of labour and land in the main industrial centres of Ho Chi Minh City and Hanoi. The following provinces have been mentioned as having large potential for the development of textile manufacturing: 
 Northeast: Phú Thọ Province, Tuyên Quang Province, Thái Nguyên Province
 North Central Coast: Thanh Hóa Province, Nghệ An Province, Quảng Trị Province, Thừa Thiên–Huế Province
 South Central Coast: Quảng Nam Province, Bình Định Province, Phú Yên Province
 Mekong Delta: Tiền Giang Province, Đồng Tháp Province
 Southeast: Tây Ninh Province
Transport costs are a major challenge in this strategy, since container shipping costs even from a major port such as Da Nang Port are estimated by Vinatext to be twice as high as in Ho Chi Minh City.
As part of this strategy Vinatex also acquired Đại Cát Tường, a formerly loss-making textile manufacturer in Quảng Ngãi Province.

Joint-Ventures
Vinatex set up a joint-venture with PetroVietnam (PetroVietnam-Vinatex Dinh Vu Joint Stock Company (PVTex)) to build Vietnam's first polyester fiber plant. The factory will be located in Haiphong and use by-products from oil-refining. It will help to reduce the Vinatex' dependence on imported materials by meeting around 40% of the domestic apparel industry's demand for synthetic fiber.

References

External links
Vinatex Official Website
Vinatex Corporate Directory
Paradox Hoodie
Vinatex at Alacrastore

Manufacturing companies based in Hanoi
Textile companies of Vietnam
Clothing manufacturers
Government-owned companies of Vietnam
Vietnamese brands